Good to Be Back is a 1989 album by American singer Natalie Cole. Released on April 19, 1989, by EMI USA, It includes the singles "Miss You Like Crazy" which peaked at number 7 on the US Billboard Hot 100 and topped the Adult Contemporary and Hot R&B Songs charts in 1989. It reached number 2 on the UK Singles Chart, becoming her biggest chart hit single there. 
The single "I Do" with Freddie Jackson hit the top 10 on US R&B Songs and the top 20 on US Dance Songs chart, two other singles released from the album: "The Rest of the Night" (UK No. 56) and "Starting Over Again" (UK No. 56).

Track listing 

1990 UK & Europe reissue includes "Wild Women Do" (Power Mix with Rap) as Track 1 (12 tracks total) from the original motion picture soundtrack Pretty Woman. Written by Greg Prestopino, Sam Lorber and Matthew Wilder and produced by André Fischer.The LP track length (4:18) and CD track length (4:29). The track was also noted to have been produced in 1990 rather than 1989 so this was probably a later issue of the album as the copyright notice was for 1990. The song is not listed on various 1991 USA reissues for this album in either Allmusic or Discogs listings, but had been released in various mixes on 7", 12" vinyl and CD singles in 1990.

Personnel 

 Natalie Cole – lead vocals, backing vocals (1-3, 6, 7, 9), vocal arrangements (1, 3, 7)
 Claude Gaudette – keyboards (1, 3, 6), synthesizers (1, 3), arrangements (1, 3, 6)
 Don Boyette – keyboards (2), synthesizers (2), bass (2), arrangements (2)
 Roman Johnson – synthesizers (2, 7), keyboards (7)
 Steve Lindsey – synthesizer programming (2), sounds (2)
 Sam Ward – synthesizer programming (2, 7), sounds (2, 7)
 Robbie Buchanan – acoustic piano (4, 8), Fender Rhodes (4, 8), rhythm track arrangements (4, 8), string arrangements (8)
 Walter Afanasieff – keyboards (5), synthesizers (5), bass (5), drum programming (5)
 Ren Klyce – E-mu Emulator II (5), Fairlight CMI (5)
 Jeff Scott – Fender Rhodes (9), acoustic piano (9)
 Lee Curreri – keyboards (9), acoustic piano (9), synthesizer programming (9), arrangements (9)
 Jeff Rona – synthesizer programming (9)
 Phil Shenale (John Philip Shenale) – synthesizer programming (9)
 Booker T. Jones – Hammond B3 organ (9)
 Rich Tancredi – keyboards (10), arrangements (10)
 Charles Floyd – acoustic piano (11), synthesizers (11)
 Teddy Castellucci – guitars (1)
 Paul Jackson Jr. – guitars (3, 4, 6, 8)
 Dean Parks – guitars (4)
 Michael Thompson – guitars (7)
 Bob Cadway – guitars (10)
 Neil Stubenhaus – bass (3, 6, 9)
 Paul Robinson – bass (4)
 Mike Porcaro – bass (8)
 Jimmy Johnson – bass (11)
 John Robinson – drums (3)
 Jeff Porcaro – drums (4, 7, 8), percussion (7)
 Joey Franco – drums (10)
 Ric Wake – drums (10), arrangements (10)
 Armand Grimaldi – drums (11)
 Luis Conte – percussion (1, 3, 6)
 Gigi Gonaway – cymbal (5)
 Paulinho da Costa – percussion (9)
 Tom Scott – alto saxophone (9)
 David Woodford – baritone saxophone (9)
 Jimmy Roberts – tenor saxophone (9)
 Garrett Adkins – trombone (9)
 Rick Braun – trumpet (9)
 André Fischer – arrangements (2), brush overdubs (11)
 Michael Masser – rhythm arrangements (8), string arrangements (8)
 Steve Skinner – arrangements (10)
 Dennis Lambert – vocal arrangements (1, 3, 6)
 Penny Ford – vocal arrangements (7)
 Eddie Cole – backing vocals (1), arrangements (11), finger snaps (11)
 David Joyce – backing vocals (1), synthesizers (11), arrangements (11)
 Katrina Perkins – backing vocals (1, 7)
 Sandra Simmons – backing vocals (1)
 Freddie Jackson – lead vocals (5)
 Jamillah Muhammad – backing vocals (10)
 Shelly Peiken – backing vocals (10)
 Billy T. Scott – backing vocals (10)

Production

 Dan Cleary – executive producer
 Natalie Cole – executive producer
 Dennis Lambert – producer (1, 3, 6) 
 André Fischer – producer (2, 7), mixing (2, 9, 11)
 Don Boyette – associate producer (2)
 Michael Masser – producer (4, 8)
 Narada Michael Walden – producer  (5)
 Roman Johnson – associate producer (7)
 Lee Curreri – producer (9) 
 Ric Wake – producer (10)
 Eddie Cole – producer (11), mixing (11)
 Doug Rider – recording (1, 3, 6)
 Mick Guzauski – recording (2, 7), mixing (2, 7, 9, 11)
 Richard McKernan – recording (2, 7), assistant engineer (3, 6)
 Calvin Harris – recording (4, 8), mixing (4, 8)
 Russ Terrana – engineer (4)
 David Frazer – recording (5), mixing (5)
 John Carter – engineer (9)
 Jimmy Hoyson – engineer (9), assistant engineer (9)
 John Beverly Jones – engineer (9)
 Rick McCormick – engineer (9)
 Bob Cadway – recording (10), mixing (10)
 Craig Burbidge – engineer (11)
 Dave Bianco – additional recording (1, 3, 6)
 Brian Malouf – additional recording (1, 6), mixing (1, 3, 6)
 Gabe Veltri – additional recording (1, 3, 6)
 Claudio Ordenas – assistant engineer (3, 6)
 Jeff Poe – assistant engineer (3, 6)
 Toby Wright – assistant engineer (3, 6)
 Steve James – assistant engineer (4, 8), production coordinator (4, 8)
 Dana Jon Chappelle – assistant engineer (5)
 Rick Butz – assistant engineer (7)
 Jim McCaan – assistant engineer (7)
 Marnie Riley – assistant engineer (7)
 Bill Dooley – assistant engineer (8)
 Mark Hagen – assistant engineer (8)
 Joe Schiff – assistant engineer (8)
 Paul Wertheimer – assistant engineer (8)
 Chris Fuhrman – assistant engineer (9)
 Craig Johnson – assistant engineer (9)
 Bernie Grundman – mastering at Bernie Grundman Mastering (Hollywood, CA)
 Henry Marquez – art direction
 LuAnn Graffeo – design
 Matthew Rolston – photography

Singles

 "Miss You Like Crazy" – Released: March 15, 1989
 "I Do" (duet with Freddie Jackson) – Released: June 10, 1989
 "The Rest of the Night" – Released: September 4, 1989
 "As A Matter Of Fact" – Released: October 30, 1989
 "Good to Be Back" - Released: November 26, 1989
 "Starting Over Again" – Released: January 1, 1990
 "Wild Women Do" (Power Mix with Rap) – Released: 1990

Charts

Certifications

References

1989 albums
Natalie Cole albums
Albums produced by Michael Masser
Albums produced by Narada Michael Walden
Elektra Records albums
EMI Records albums